= Ocean City Boardwalk =

Ocean City Boardwalk can refer to:

- Ocean City Boardwalk (Maryland) in Ocean City, Maryland
- Ocean City Boardwalk (New Jersey) in Ocean City, New Jersey
